This article shows all participating team squads at the 2022 Women's European Water Polo Championship.

Group A

The following is Croatia's roster at the 2022 Women's European Water Polo Championship.

Head coach: Aljoša Kunac

 
 Bruna Barišić 
 Kiara Brnetić 
 Domina Butić 
 Ivana Butić 
 Jelena Butić 
 Magdalena Butić 
 Ana Desnica 
 Nina Eterović 
 Dora Kangler 
 Dina Lordan 
 Andrea Marić 
 Emmi Miljković 
 Alexandra Ratković 
 Iva Rožić 
 Matea Skelin

The following is Germana's roster at the 2022 Women's European Water Polo Championship.

Head coach: Sven Schulz

 
 Gesa Deike 
 Ira Deike 
 Aylin Fry 
 Felicitas Guse 
 Darja Heinbichner 
 Marijke Elisabeth Kijlstra 
 Lynn Krukenberg 
 Franka Lipinski  
 Elena Ludwig
 Ioanna Petiki 
 Sinia Plotz 
 Anne Rieck 
 Jana Stüwe 
 Greta Isabella Tadday 
 Belen Muriel Vosseberg

The following is Greece's roster at the 2022 Women's European Water Polo Championship.

Head coach: Alexia Kammenou

 
 Ioanna Chydirioti
 Eleni Elliniadi
 Athina Dimitra Giannopoulou
 Maria Myriokefalitaki
 Eirini Ninou
 Maria Patra 
 Eleftheria Plevritou 
 Margarita Plevritou 
 Vasiliki Plevritou 
 Stefania Santa
 Christina Siouti 
 Eleni Sotireli 
 Ioanna Stamatopoulou 
 Foteini Tricha 
 Eleni Xenaki

The following is Hungary's roster at the 2022 Women's European Water Polo Championship.

Head coach: Attila Bíró

 
 Dalma Domsodi
 Kamilla Faragó 
 Tamara Farkas 
 Krisztina Garda 
 Gréta Gurisatti 
 Brigitta Horváth
 Alexandra Kiss 
 Dóra Leimeter 
 Alda Magyari 
 Géraldine Mahieu
 Zsuzsanna Máté 
 Rebecca Parkes 
 Kinga Peresztegi-Nagy 
 Dorottya Szilágyi 
 Vanda Vályi

The following is Netherlands's roster at the 2022 Women's European Water Polo Championship.

Head coach: Evangelos Doudesis

 
 Laura Aarts 
 Fleurien Bosveld 
 Kitty-Lynn Joustra 
 Maartje Keuning 
 Ilse Koolhaas 
 Lola Moolhuijzen
 Bente Rogge 
 Vivian Sevenich 
 Brigitte Sleeking 
 Nina ten Broek
 Simone van de Kraats 
 Sabrina van der Sloot 
 Britt van den Dobbelsteen 
 Rozanne Voorvelt 
 Iris Wolves

The following is Romania's roster at the 2022 Women's European Water Polo Championship.

Head coach: Berttini Nenciu

 
 Xenia-Bianca Bonca 
 Andra Bunea 
 Demi Carpatorea
 Bianca Dumitru
 Mariia Dvorzhetska 
 Chelsea Gandrabura 
 Nikolette Laboncz
 Alexia Maria Matei Guiman
 Anastasiia Melnychuk
 Debora-Julia Nagy
 Alina-Ioana Olteanu
 Krisztina-Emese Szeghalmi
 Szabina Szilagyi
 Diana Togănel 
 Anita-Johanna Toth

Group B

The following is France's roster at the 2022 Women's European Water Polo Championship.

Head coach: Émilien Bugeaud

 
 Aurelie Battu 
 Camelia Bouloukbachi 
 Anne Collas 
 Audrey Daule 
 Juliette Dhalluin 
 Lucie Fanara 
 Gabrielle Fitaire 
 Louise Guillet 
 Valentine Heurtaux
 Viviane Kretzmann-Bahia 
 Morgane Le Roux
 Estelle Millot 
 Tiziana Raspo
 Ema Vernoux 
 Chloé Vidal

The following is Israel's roster at the 2022 Women's European Water Polo Championship.

Head coach: Dimitrios Mavrotas

 
 Lior Ben David  
 Maria Bogachenko 
 Yahav Farkash 
 Hila Futorian 
 Inbar Geva 
 Nofar Hochberg 
 Veronika Kordonskaia 
 Tahel Levi 
 Moran Lindhout 
 Dar Menakerman  
 Kerem Noy 
 Ayelet Peres 
 Noa Sasover 
 Shunit Strugo 
 Alma Yaacobi

The following is Italy's roster at the 2022 Women's European Water Polo Championship.

Head coach: Carlo Silipo

 
 Silvia Avegno 
 Caterina Banchelli 
 Dafne Bettini
 Roberta Bianconi 
 Lucrezia Lys Cergol
 Agnese Cocchiere
 Giuseppina Condorelli
 Luna Di Claudio
 Giuditta Galardi
 Sofia Giustini
 Claudia Marletta 
 Valeria Palmieri 
 Domitilla Picozzi
 Chiara Tabani 
 Giulia Viacava

The following is Serbia's roster at the 2022 Women's European Water Polo Championship.

Head coach: Dragana Ivković

 
 Lolita Avdić 
 Hristina Ilić 
 Janja Kaplarević  
 Vanja Lazić 
 Iva Lujić 
 Jana Lujić 
 Nada Mandić 
 Kristina Miladinović 
 Ana Milićević 
 Anja Mišković 
 Nadja Novaković 
 Milana Popov 
 Anja Švec 
 Nikolina Travar 
 Jelena Vuković

The following is Slovakia's roster at the 2022 Women's European Water Polo Championship.

Head coach: Szabolcs Eschwig-Hajts

 
 Tamara Dubná 
 Emma Dvoranová 
 Lenka Garančovská 
 Julia Janov 
 Karin Kačková 
 Martina Kiernoszová 
 Beáta Kováčiková 
 Janka Kurucová 
 Nikita Petty 
 Monika Sedláková 
 Bronislava Šepeľová 
 Kristina Stehlíková

The following is Spain's roster at the 2022 Women's European Water Polo Championship.

Head coach: Miki Oca

 
 Paula Camus 
 Anni Espar 
 Laura Ester 
 Judith Forca 
 Maica García Godoy 
 Irene González 
 Paula Leitón  
 Cristina Nogue Frigola 
 Beatriz Ortiz 
 Pili Peña 
 Nona Perez Vivas 
 Paula Prats Rodriguez  
 Elena Ruiz 
 Martina Terre

References

Women
Women's European Water Polo Championship
European Water Polo Championship squads
European Championship